Tantsi z zirkamy (Dancing with the Stars) is a Ukrainian dance competition show that premiered on October 7, 2006, on 1+1. The show is based on the British television series Strictly Come Dancing, being one of several iterations of the Dancing with the Stars franchise.

It was first hosted by Yurii Horbunov and Tina Karol, who hosted it together until 2020, when Tina Karol left the franchise. In 2021, she was replaced by Ivanna Onufriichuk. The show also has a tradition of invited celebrity co-hosts that change every episode, among which are previous winners and participants.

Cast

Presenters
Key:
 Host
 Co-host
 Co-host and competed as a contestant before elimination
 Competed as a contestant

Judging panel

Key:
 Judge
 Guest judge
 Competed as a contestant
 Competed as a professional

Professional dancers and their partners

Key:
 Winner of the series
 Second place of the series
 Third place of the series
 First elimination of the series
 Withdrew in the series
 Elimination of the series

Episodes

Series overview

Season 1

Season 2

Season 3

Season 4

Season 5

Season 6

Season 7

Season 8

Score

Red numbers indicate the lowest score for each week.
Green numbers indicate the highest score for each week.
 indicates the couple eliminated that week.
 indicates the couple that finished in the bottom two.
 indicates the couple that withdrew.
 indicates the couple that was saved from elimination by another couple's withdrawal.
 indicates the winning couple.
 indicates the runner-up couple.
 indicates the couple in third place.

Season 9

Score

Red numbers indicate the lowest score for each week.
Green numbers indicate the highest score for each week.
 the couple has an immunity, and could not be eliminated
 indicates the couple eliminated that week.
 indicates the couple that finished in the bottom two or three.
 indicates the couple that withdrew.
 indicates the couple that was saved from elimination by another couple's withdrawal.
 indicates the winning couple.
 indicates the runner-up couple.
 indicates the couple in third place.

References 

Ukraine
1+1 (TV channel) original programming
2006 Ukrainian television series debuts